Sebastião José Lopes de Melo e Nogueira (born 9 September 1988) is a Portuguese footballer who plays as a midfielder for Oriental.

Club career
He made his professional debut in the Cypriot First Division for Nea Salamina on 29 August 2009 in a game against Ethnikos Achna.

References

1988 births
People from Seia
Living people
Portuguese footballers
Association football midfielders
Portuguese expatriate footballers
Onisilos Sotira players
Expatriate footballers in Cyprus
Portuguese expatriate sportspeople in Cyprus
Nea Salamis Famagusta FC players
Ermis Aradippou FC players
Cypriot First Division players
Cypriot Second Division players
Clube Oriental de Lisboa players
C.D. Cova da Piedade players
Sportspeople from Guarda District